Anyone Who Had a Heart may refer to:

 "Anyone Who Had a Heart" (song), a song by Burt Bacharach and Hal David 
 Anyone Who Had a Heart (Dionne Warwick album), 1964
 Anyone Who Had a Heart (Joe Chindamo album), 1997